Domnino is a rural locality (a village) in Lyakhovskoye Rural Settlement, Melenkovsky District, Vladimir Oblast, Russia. The population was 12 as of 2010.

Geography 
Domnino is located 18 km east of Melenki (the district's administrative centre) by road. Bolshaya Sala is the nearest rural locality.

References 

Rural localities in Melenkovsky District
Melenkovsky Uyezd